David Ritchie Adamson (March 10, 1923 – July 31, 2011) was a Royal Canadian Air Force and Canadian Forces Air Command officer. He served as deputy commander of NORAD from 1976 to 1978.

References

1923 births
2011 deaths
People from Lloydminster
Royal Canadian Air Force officers
Canadian Forces Air Command generals
Canadian military personnel from Saskatchewan